The 2002 German Athletics Championships were held at the Lohrheidestadion in Bochum-Wattenscheid on 5–7 July 2002.

Results

Men

Women

References 
 Results source: 

2002
German Athletics Championships
German Athletics Championships